Raanan Gissin (born 1949) is an Israeli political scientist, analyst and consultant specializing in the Arab–Israeli conflict. He was senior adviser to Israeli Prime Minister Ariel Sharon and a frequent spokesman for the Israeli government on CNN, MSNBC, and Fox.

Life
Gissin has Israeli Jewish roots with his family going back five generations. Raanan Gissim was born in Ra'anana, Israel, in 1949; thus, the selection of his name. In July, 1949 his parents moved in to found kibbutz HaSolelim. He was born there February 28, 1949.

When my great-grandparents came from Russia a hundred and fifty years ago, my grandfather came with a Bible in one hand and a rifle in another, and his hand was extended to the Arabs who lived here, some did make business with him and others who fought him had to meet the wrath of his rifle, and that’s how you live in the Middle East.

Education
1973 B.A., Hebrew University of Jerusalem.
1975 M.Sc. in Broadcasting Journalism, Hebrew University of Jerusalem.
1979 PhD in Political Science and Public Administration, Syracuse University, New York.

Other involvement
He is featured as an authority in the documentary Relentless: The Struggle for Peace in the Middle East.
Col. (Res.) Raanan Gissin, PhD., has in recent years become one of Israel's leading spokesmen to the international press on security and strategic issues, and the peace process. Until recently (2001–2006), he served as Foreign Press & Public Adviser to the Prime Minister of Israel.

In 1996, Gissin was appointed Spokesperson for the newly formed Ministry of National Infrastructure headed by Minister Ariel Sharon. He also served as Mr. Sharon's personal Adviser of Public and Media Affairs. He currently serves as a strategic consultant, commentator and lecturer on a variety of topics related to the Middle East, Israel, the war against terror, and media and government relations. In 1998, he became Senior Public Affairs and Media Adviser to Minister of Foreign Affairs Ariel Sharon.

He participated in the conference and negotiations which led to the signing of the Wye Memorandum in October 1998 in Washington D.C. In 1999, following the change of government, he continued to serve as a special consultant to Ariel Sharon. In 2003, he received the  Louis Brandeis Award of outstanding contribution to Zionism and for dedication to the cause of attaining peace and security for the State of Israel. During the period 2001–2006, he has served as Foreign Press & Public Affairs Adviser and reported directly to the Prime Ministers Ariel Sharon and Ehud Olmert.

References

1949 births
Mass media about the Arab–Israeli conflict
Ariel Sharon
Hebrew University of Jerusalem alumni
Israeli Jews
Israeli political scientists
Israeli political writers
Jewish writers
Living people
People from Kiryat Gat
People from Ra'anana
Syracuse University alumni
Spokespersons